Ronald Darrell "Ronnie" Thomas (born March 8, 1955) is a retired NASCAR driver who drove in the Winston Cup series from 1977 to 1989 and the Busch Series in 1982 and 1985. He was the 1978 NASCAR Winston Cup Rookie of the Year, edging out Roger Hamby in a race that went down to the wire at the Los Angeles Times 500. Thomas's father, Jabe Thomas was also a NASCAR driver. In 1980, his best season he finished 14th in the points in the No. 25 Stone's Cafeteria car. He led a career total of four laps in Winston Cup competition.

NASCAR Winston Cup Series results

References

External links

1955 births
Living people
NASCAR drivers
ARCA Menards Series drivers
People from Christiansburg, Virginia
Racing drivers from Virginia